Veríssimo de Lencastre (1615–1692) was a Roman Catholic cardinal.

Episcopal succession

References

1615 births
1692 deaths
17th-century Italian cardinals